Stukeley is a surname.

Stukeley may also refer to:

 Great Stukeley, village in Cambridgeshire, England
 Little Stukeley, village in Cambridgeshire, England
 The Stukeleys, civil parish in the district of Huntingdonshire, in Cambridgeshire, England